Gérard Adanhoumé (born 26 November 1986 in Cotonou) is a Beninese football player who currently plays for Soleil FC.

International career
Adanhoume presented the Benin national football team at the 2010 Africa Cup of Nations in Angola.

References

1986 births
Living people
Beninese footballers
Benin international footballers
2010 Africa Cup of Nations players
People from Cotonou

Association football midfielders
Soleil FC players